Ann Gosling is a British actress. She starred in the sitcom Next of Kin in which she played Georgia Prentice for three series from 1995 until 1997, starring alongside Penelope Keith and William Gaunt.

She has also had roles in Tracey Ullman: A Class Act in 1992, followed by a role as Joanna Tate in Chandler & Co in 1994. Gosling also appeared in Jim's Gift and in a production of Sunday in the Park with George for the National Theatre. She had a starring role as Maxine Lightfoot, the daughter of Hugh Bonneville's character, in BBC Radio 4 sitcom Married that aired for three seasons.

Gosling attended Misbourne School.

References

External links

British television actresses
Year of birth missing (living people)
Living people